A.H. Würgler (date of birth unknown) was a footballer who played as goalkeeper for FC Basel in the 1910s.

Football career
Würgler joined FC Basel's first team during their 1910–11 season. He played his first game for the club in the away friendly game in the Espenmoos, on 2 April 1911, as Basel played a 1–1 draw with St. Gallen. According to the existing documentation Würgler played three friendly matches this season.

Würgler played his domestic league debut for the club in their 1911–12 season. This was in home game in the Landhof on 12 February 1912 as Basel won 4–1 against Étoile-Sporting.

Between the years 1910 and 1912 Würgler played at least seven games for Basel. Two of these games were in the Swiss Serie A and five were friendly games.

Notes

Footnotes

Incomplete league matches 1910–11 season: Aarau-FCB, FCB-YB, Stella-FCB, FCB-Biel, FCB-Aarau, YB-FCB, FCB-Stella, OB-FCB, Bern-FCB and Biel-FCB

Incomplete league matches 1911–12 season: FCB-Nordstern, LcdF-FCB, Sporting-FCB, Biel-FCB, FCB-Biel, YB-FCB

References

Sources
 Rotblau: Jahrbuch Saison 2017/2018. Publisher: FC Basel Marketing AG. 
 Die ersten 125 Jahre. Publisher: Josef Zindel im Friedrich Reinhardt Verlag, Basel. 
 Verein "Basler Fussballarchiv" Homepage

FC Basel players
Association football goalkeepers
Swiss Super League players
Year of birth missing
Year of death missing
Date of birth missing
Date of death missing
Swiss men's footballers